The Pottuvil Massacre was a disputed event in the Sri Lankan Civil War. On Monday, 18 September 2006, 10 unarmed Muslim civilians  engaged in clearing a reservoir at Rattal Kulam in Pottuvil in the southern part of the Ampara District were attacked and killed. 

All the men were aged between 19–35 years of age; three of the men were decapitated and the others were shot or hacked to death by the unknown gunmen.

Initially a BBC report stated that members of the Muslim community accused the Special Task Force of involvement in this incident. 

The local Muslim population staged protests demanding the removal of the STF officers. They also questioned how the LTTE could infiltrate into an area carrying swords, kill 10 people and then leave without the STF spotting them; with no encounter between the LTTE and the STF taking place. 

Rauff Hakeem, the leader of the SLMC, requested an international commission to probe the incident. 

Amid these accusations the government had acted irregularly. The ambulance transporting the only survivor was prevented by police from going to the hospital at a predominant Muslim town called Kalmunai. The ambulance was redirected to a hospital at Sinhalese dominated Ampara. At the hospital the survivor was held incommunicado by armed guards. Further the SLMM was prevented from talking to the survivor. Eyewitness also reported that the police destroyed crime scene evidence.

The sole survivor of the attack, Kareem Meera Mohideen, recuperating from grave injuries in the hospital, identified the rebels of the Liberation Tigers of Tamil Eelam (LTTE) as the attackers. However, serious questions have been raised about how the interview was conducted, apparently when the survivor’s family was unable to visit him in hospital and he was completely isolated.

The Indian based anti-rebel South Asian Terrorist portal claimed that the LTTE tried its best, to wash its hands off the incident by blaming it on the STF.

Despite this the Muslims continued protesting against the STF and suspected a cover up:

The majority of Pottuvil residents remain convinced that the state is engaged in a cover up. The Sri Lankan state forces themselves have a history of intimidating witnesses and forcing false statements.

No independent or international commission to probe this incident has been carried out til date.

References

External links
Muslims protest against massacre
The morning leader report
Video interview with the sole survivor

2006 crimes in Sri Lanka
Attacks on civilians attributed to the Liberation Tigers of Tamil Eelam
Attacks on civilians attributed to the Sri Lanka Police
Massacres in Sri Lanka
Liberation Tigers of Tamil Eelam attacks in Eelam War IV
Mass murder in 2006
Mass murder of Sri Lankan Muslims
Terrorist incidents in Sri Lanka in 2006